The elections for the Chandigarh Municipal Corporation were held in December 2006. The candidates were in fray for the election to 21 seats (wards) of Chandigarh union territory.

Congress had won 12 seats out of total 21. Congress was the largest party followed by BJP with 6 seats, SAD with 2 seats, BSP with 1 and 0 independent.

Background
2001 Chandigarh Municipal Corporation election was the previous election in which Congress party won 13 seats out of total 20 and was the single largest party. BJP won 3 seats and its alliance partner Shiromani Akali Dal (SAD) won 1 seat. Chandigarh Vikas Manch won 3 seats.

Results 
Congress party won 12 seats out of total 21 and was the single largest party. BJP won 6 seats and its alliance partner Shiromani Akali Dal (SAD) won 2 seats. BSP won 3 seats.

Aftermath
The Chandigarh Municipal Corporation council completed its tenure of 5 years. After the council's term had expired, 2011 Chandigarh Municipal Corporation election were held.

References

Chandigarh
Elections in Chandigarh
2000s in Chandigarh
2006 elections in India